Percy O. Clapp (March 10, 1900 – July 2, 1960) was an American college football player and coach. He served as the head football coach at Milwaukee State Teachers College—renamed from Milwaukee Normal School in 1927 and now known as the University of Wisconsin–Milwaukee—from 1925 to 1930 and at Lawrence College—now known as Lawrence University—in Appleton, Wisconsin from 1931 to 1934. Clapp was the an assistant coach coach for two years at the University of Idaho under head coach Ted Bank. 

Clapp played college football at the University of Minnesota as a tackle and guard from 1923 to 1924. He was hired at the head football and track coach at Milwaukee Normal in 1925. Clapp served in both world wars and later worked for the Veterans Administration in Saint Paul, Minnesota. Following an illness that forced an early retirement, he died at age 60 in Saint Paul, and is buried at Fort Snelling National Cemetery, south of Minneapolis.

Head coaching record

Football

References

External links
 

1900 births
1960 deaths
American football guards
American football tackles
Idaho Vandals football coaches
Lawrence Vikings football coaches
Milwaukee Panthers athletic directors
Milwaukee Panthers football  coaches
Minnesota Golden Gophers football players
Wisconsin–River Falls Falcons football players
College track and field coaches in the United States
People from St. Croix County, Wisconsin
Coaches of American football from Wisconsin
Players of American football from Wisconsin